Oliver Podhorin (born 6 July 1992) is a Slovak professional footballer who currently plays as a centre-back for MFK Skalica.

Club career
Podhorín was born in Michalovce, Slovakia. Podhorín won the 2014–15 DOXXbet liga with Zemplín Michalovce. He made his Fortuna Liga debut for Zemplín Michalovce against AS Trenčín on 18 July 2015. He played the entire game as a center back. Trenčín still won 1-0.

References

External links
 MFK Zemplín Michalovce official profile
 Futbalnet profile
 Eurofotbal profile
 

1992 births
Living people
People from Michalovce
Sportspeople from the Košice Region
Slovak footballers
Association football defenders
MFK Zemplín Michalovce players
FK Senica players
SC Wiener Neustadt players
FC Nitra players
Resovia (football) players
GKS Jastrzębie players
MFK Skalica players
2. Liga (Slovakia) players
Slovak Super Liga players
2. Liga (Austria) players
I liga players
Expatriate footballers in Austria
Slovak expatriate sportspeople in Austria
Expatriate footballers in Poland
Slovak expatriate sportspeople in Poland